Elysius ordinaria is a moth of the family Erebidae. It was described by William Schaus in 1894. It is found in Brazil.

References

ordinaria
Moths described in 1894
Moths of South America